Ancorina is a genus of sea sponges belonging to the family Ancorinidae. It is the type genus of its family.

This genus is characterized by a high density of siliceous spicules. Members of this genus are known to be eaten by hawksbill turtles.

Species
The following species are recognised in the genus Ancorina:

Ancorina bellae Kelly & Sim-Smith, 2012
Ancorina brevidens Dendy & Frederick, 1924
Ancorina buldira Lehnert & Stone, 2014
Ancorina cerebrum Schmidt, 1862
Ancorina corticata Lévi, 1964
Ancorina diplococcus Dendy, 1924
Ancorina geodides (Carter, 1886)
Ancorina globosa Kelly & Sim-Smith, 2012
Ancorina multistella (Lendenfeld, 1907)
Ancorina nanosclera Lévi, 1967
Ancorina radix Marenzeller, 1889
Ancorina repens Wiedenmayer, 1989
Ancorina robusta (Carter, 1883)
Ancorina stalagmoides Dendy, 1924

References

Tetractinellida
Taxa named by Eduard Oscar Schmidt